Kajaran Municipality, referred to as Kajaran Community ( Kajaran Hamaynk), is an urban community and administrative subdivision of Syunik Province of Armenia, at the south of the country. Composed of a group of settlements, its administrative centre is the town of Kajaran.

Included settlements

See also
Syunik Province

References

Communities in Syunik Province
2017 establishments in Armenia